Carlos González Ragel (December 22, 1899 - November 28, 1969) was a Spanish painter and photographer.

Biography

Early life
González was born in Jerez de la Frontera, Spain on December 22, 1899 to a middle-class family. His father, Diego González Lozano, owned a photography studio and taught his son photography. At age nine, González's mother died and his father spent less time with him. González attended the College of the Marianists, but dropped out due to conflicts with teachers.

At age 16, González and his brother Diego moved to Madrid. González enrolled in the School of Arts and Crafts, but did not finish his studies there. It was reported because his style of painting was not acceptable at the school. González returned to Jerez to work with his father and his brother Javier in the photography studio.

Career
González created a form of pictorial expression that he called "Esqueletomaquia". He defined that as "... the art of seeing beyond what reach our eyes." He sees living things as they are in their transitional passage on earth, but as they will take some time after buried or enclosed in a niche. It's death, in his representation of skeleton pruning. Moreover, by virtue of his strange and peculiar vision, skulls or skeletons of their "victims" have a strong physiognomic resemblance and body. It is recognized immediately.

For their studies of the human body, used, no doubt, of the films included in the work of Andreas Vesalius' De Humani Fabrica Corporis published in 1543 and which had an issue. heir skeletons represent the destination to death with a black sense of humor of its author as well as analyzing expression of a society. Rachel laughs at death and it makes her smile and harmless. His creations do not inspire terror or darken thoughts. Their dead are funny people, jocund, who have not learned yet that they no longer live or still "good health". Pablo Picasso admired his painting was an attempt to represent life and death of critically and poignant true to his nature.

González staged six exhibitions. He opened the first on February 16, 1931 with figures as skeletons in the Museum of Modern Art. The exhibition emphasized drawings and caricatures, from politicians to ordinary people. After González closed his photography studio, he spent his time painting, with periods of high production and others of inactivity. Jose Franco said in an article published in World Chart in 1931 that González works are full of "satirical prints" with which the author makes a critical social and human aspects of the time using "metamorphosis and deformation reality."

In 1936, González, suffering from alcoholism, first entered the Psychiatric Hospital of Malaga. After leaving the hospital, he and his wife Amalia went to Seville. However, his condition deteriorated again and he was admitted to the Psychiatric Hospital in Seville.

In 1937 González held his third exhibition in Seville, exhibiting esqueleotomaquias of celebrities and politicians.  Back in Jerez lives in a house on the road cutting to the christening as Villa Esqueletomáquia. In this house lives with great hardship and in which it said was missing anything. There was no lack of truth and the phone, ham, cheese and the maid were painted on the wall.

In 1941 the hotel celebrated its fourth exhibition Swan with pictures similar to that of Seville, and in 1942 set out in the Hotel Palace in Madrid. From that date onwards his painting became darker, with translation of states of suffering and nightmares, similar to what happened to Goya.

Later life
In 1955 González held his last exhibition at the Swan Hotel. He was soon admitted to the sanatorium of St. John of God in Ciempozuelos, where he spent the rest of his life. González continued to draw and paint. He created esqueletomaquias of Don Quixote, Goya, and Van Gogh.

On November 28, 1969 González died.

Legacy
From December 2007 to March 2008 an exhibition entitled The Spanish Night was held at the Museo Nacional Reina Sofía Modern Art. Flamenco, avant-garde and popular culture 1865-1939. Twelve of his works were displayed.

References

People from Jerez de la Frontera
1899 births
1969 deaths
20th-century Spanish painters
20th-century Spanish male artists
Spanish male painters